Lucius Davenport Amerson (October 7, 1933 – March 15, 1994) was an American sheriff who in 1967 became the first black sheriff in the South since Reconstruction. He was elected to office in Macon County, Alabama and started his role in January 1967. Amerson served for 20 years, until 1987, being re-elected four times.

Amerson was born in Clinton, Alabama in 1933, the son of Henry Amerson, a farmer, and Lewinie Amerson.

References 

1933 births
1994 deaths
African-American sheriffs
Alabama sheriffs
People from Macon County, Alabama
20th-century African-American people